Meesha Shafi is a Pakistani-born Canadian singer, actress and model.

She made her film debut with a supporting role in the 2013 Mira Nair's film The Reluctant Fundamentalist. She achieved further critical success for her role of Laxmi, an Indian spy agency Research and Analysis Wing's operative, in Bilal Lashari's action thriller film Waar, which ranks among the highest-grossing Pakistani films of all time in Pakistan.

Early life 
Shafi was born in Lahore, Pakistan 1981 to actress Saba Hameed and Syed Pervaiz Shafi. She did her A Levels from Lahore Grammar School and graduated with a degree in fine arts from National College of Arts in 2007. In 2016, Shafi became a Canadian citizen.

Career

Modelling 
Shafi entered the modelling industry at the age of 17, when she starred opposite Jawad Ahmed in the music video for the song "Bin Teray Kya Hai Jeena". In 2009 Shafi became the brand ambassador for L'Oreal Paris Pakistan. She has featured in many Pakistani magazines and in international publications such as L'Officiel and Vogue India.

Acting 
Shafi made her screen debut with the 2006 serial Muhabbat Khawab Ki Soorat on Hum TV. She then appeared in Geo TV serial Ye Zindagi To Woh Nahi in 2007.

She made her film debut with Mira Nair's 2012 Hollywood film, The Reluctant Fundamentalist (based on Mohsin Hamid's novel of the same name), alongside Kate Hudson and Riz Ahmed.
The film describes the bad impact of Americans toward Muslims after 9/11. Shafi had a minor role and appeared in only two scenes in the film in the role of the male lead's sister. The film received mixed reviews from critics, and failed to break even at the box office.

She then acted in Bilal Lashari's Pakistani film Waar, alongside Shaan Shahid. Her portrayal of Laxmi, an Indian spy agency Research and Analysis Wing's operative was critically praised by the Pakistani media. The movie won her the 'Best Supporting Actress' award at the ARY Film Awards in 2014.

In 2016, Shafi has a lead role in the TV costume drama Mor Mahal which is set in the mid-19th century.

Music career 
Shafi started her singing career with the band Overload with her husband, but left in 2011. Shafi sang along with the internationally acclaimed folk singer Arif Lohar on Coke Studio Pakistan Season 3, with the song "Alif Allah (Jugni)". The single, originally composed and performed by Lohar, gathered over 20 million+ views on YouTube, was the most-viewed Coke Studio song ever, until it was overtaken by "Tajdaar-e-Haram", and was used in several films like Cocktail, Diary of a Butterfly and Jugni.

She sang a rendition of the folk song "Chori Chori", which received mixed reviews. She returned to Coke Studio (Season 5) in 2012 when she sang "Ishq Aap Bhi Awalla" with the Chakwalees and sang a ghazal by Faiz Ahmad Faiz, "Dasht-e-Tanhai".

In 2014, Meesha Shafi returned to the Coke Studio floor for a third time to perform "Sun Ve Balori" with the composer and tabla guru Ustad Tafu and producers Strings.

In 2015, Meesha Shafi lent her vocals to two OSTs. One being 'EVA' that was produced by Strings is featured on the soundtrack of the film Moor, released in August 2015, and directed by director Jami.

In August 2015, she released 'Mehram Dilaan De Mahi' for the OST of the biopic (directed and portrayed on screen by Sarmad Khoosat), based on the life and works of prose writer, Manto. The track is produced by True Brew Records and the lyrics are by Punjabi poet Shiv Kumar Batalvi. 'Manto' was released on 11 September 2015.

TV appearance 
In April 2013, Shafi joined Strings, Ali Azmat, Shahzad Hasan and Alamgir as a judge and mentor on the singing talent show Cornetto Music Icons, aired on ARY Digital.

In July 2017,Meesha Shafi joined Fawad Khan and Farooq Ahmed in the audition round as judge while Khan, Shafi, Atif Aslam and Shahi Hasan were the judges in the knockout round of Pepsi Battle of the Bands Season 2. Ayesha Omer is the host of the season.[12]

Shafi also went on to judge Season 3 and 4 of Pepsi Battle of the Bands!

Personal life 
Shafi's maternal grandfather, Hameed Akhtar, was a novelist and newspaper columnist, president of the Progressive Writers' Movement, and editor of Urdu daily newspapers including Imroz and Nawa-e-Waqt. In 2008, she married musician Mahmood Rahman. The couple have two children, a daughter named Janevi, and a son named Kazimir.

Ali Zafar Incident 
In 2018 Meesha Shafi accused actor Ali Zafar of sexual harassment. She filed a case with the Punjab Ombudsperson (who is supposed to adjudicate cases of harassment of women in the workplace), who declined to hear the case because she "did not have an employer-employee relationship" with Zafar. An appeal she filed with the governor was dismissed, again on "technical grounds". Lahore High Court rejected her case on the basis that there was no employer-employee relationship between Ali and Meesha. Meesha's case helped in spotting out loophole in Pakistani justice system according to which a woman cannot make harassment allegations against someone unless she's employed by the accused party. On 17 September 2019 Meesha Shafi filed a civil defamation case against Zafar for statements made he made in April 2019 on Hum News, which alleged that she was lying about the sexual harassment allegations against him in order to obtain fame and Canadian immigration. Shafi denied these accusations, arguing that she was already a celebrity as well as a Canadian citizen at the time of the original complaint.

On 29 September 2020, Ali Zafar won petition to have Shafi's civil defamation case against him stopped while he launched a FIR against Meesha Shafi and eight others for posting defamatory content against him on their Twitter, Facebook and Instagram accounts.

Shafi won an appeal against Lahore High Court's decision to stop her defamation case in favor of Zafar's on 19 January 2022.

Acting career

Filmography

TV

Discography

Coke Studio songs

Lollywood

Pepsi Battle of the Bands

Velo Sound Station Songs

See also 
 Coke Studio
 List of Pakistani models
 List of Pakistani actresses

References

External links 
 

1981 births
Living people
Actresses from Lahore
Singers from Lahore
Pakistani film actresses
Pakistani television actresses
Pakistani female models
National College of Arts alumni
Pakistani emigrants to Canada
Naturalized citizens of Canada
Canadian film actresses
Canadian television actresses
Canadian female models
Punjabi people
Punjabi women
Lahore Grammar School alumni
Coke Studio (Pakistani TV program)
Actresses in Urdu cinema
Actresses in Hindi cinema
Pakistani expatriate actresses in India
21st-century Pakistani actresses
21st-century Pakistani women singers
21st-century Canadian actresses
21st-century Canadian women singers